Erik Åsbrink (born 1 February 1947) is a Swedish politician and former minister in two Social Democratic governments led by Ingvar Carlsson and Göran Persson. Later Åsbrink took part in shaping the informal guidelines called the 'business code of ethics'. Since July 2011 Åsbrink has been an international advisor to Goldman Sachs.  In this position Åsbrink gives the bank strategic consultancy on growth opportunities in Sweden and the Nordic countries.

Åsbrink was married to fellow politician Ylva Johansson from 2002 to 2015.

References

External links 
 Erik Åsbrink at the Riksdag website

1947 births
Living people
Politicians from Stockholm
Swedish Ministers for Finance
Members of the Riksdag from the Social Democrats
Central bankers
Goldman Sachs people